Lafayette is a city in and the county seat of Tippecanoe County, Indiana, United States, located  northwest of Indianapolis and  southeast of Chicago. West Lafayette, on the other side of the Wabash River, is home to Purdue University, which contributes significantly to both communities. Together, Lafayette and West Lafayette form the core of the Lafayette metropolitan area, which had a population of 224,709 in the 2021 US Census Bureau estimates.  

According to the 2020 United States Census, the population of Lafayette was 70,783, a 25% increase from 56,397 in 2000. Meanwhile, the 2020 Census  listed the neighboring city of West Lafayette at 44,595 and the Tippecanoe County population at 186,291.

Lafayette was founded in 1825 on the southeast bank of the Wabash River near where the river becomes impassable for riverboats upstream, though a French fort and trading post had existed since 1717 on the opposite bank and three miles downstream. It was named for the French general Marquis de Lafayette, a Revolutionary War hero.

History

When European explorers arrived at this area, it was inhabited by a tribe of Miami Indians known as the Ouiatenon or Weas. In 1717, the French government established Fort Ouiatenon across the Wabash River and three miles (5 km) south of present-day Lafayette. The fort became the center of trade for fur trappers, merchants and Indians. An annual reenactment and festival known as Feast of the Hunters' Moon is held there each autumn.

The town of Lafayette was platted in May 1825 by William Digby, a trader. It was designated as the county seat of the newly formed Tippecanoe County the following year. Like many frontier towns, Lafayette was named for General Lafayette, a French officer who significantly aided George Washington's Continental Army during the American Revolutionary War. Lafayette toured the United States in 1824 and 1825.

In its earliest days, Lafayette was a shipping center on the Wabash River. In 1838, Henry Leavitt Ellsworth, the first United States Patent Commissioner, published a booklet titled Valley of the Upper Wabash, Indiana, with Hints on Its Agricultural Advantages, to promote settlement of the region. By 1845, Ellsworth had purchased  of farmland around Lafayette and moved there from Connecticut to supervise land sales. By 1847 Ellsworth was distributing broadsides looking for farmers to purchase his farmland. He became president of the Tippecanoe County Agricultural Society in April 1851 – despite some local resentment over what was called "the Yale Crowd" – but he was defeated the same year when he ran for the Indiana House of Representatives. Ellsworth Street and Ellsworth Historic District are named for him.

The Wabash and Erie Canal in the 1840s stimulated trade and affirmed Lafayette's regional prominence. Railroads arrived in the town in the 1850s, connecting it with other major markets. The Monon Railroad connected Lafayette with other sections of Indiana.

Lafayette was the site of the first official airmail delivery in the United States on 17 August 1859, when John Wise piloted a balloon starting on the Lafayette courthouse grounds.  Wise hoped to reach New York; however, weather conditions forced the balloon down near Crawfordsville, Indiana, and the mail reached its final destination by train. In 1959, the US Postal Service issued a 7¢ airmail stamp commemorating the centennial of the event.

Geography
Lafayette is located at  (40.410585, −86.874681) and is located in Fairfield and Wea Townships.

Neighborhoods 

 Columbian Park 
 Hanna
 Hedgewood
 Lincoln
 Monon
 Saint Lawrence/McAllister
 Vinton
 Wallace Triangle
 Wildcat Valley

Historic Neighborhoods
 Centennial Neighborhood District
 Downtown Lafayette Historic District
 Ellsworth Historic District
 Highland Park Neighborhood Historic District
 Jefferson Historic District
 Ninth Street Hill Neighborhood Historic District
 Perrin Historic District
 St. Mary Historic District
 Upper Main Street Historic District

Climate 

Demographics

Lafayette is the larger principal city of the Lafayette-Frankfort CSA, a Combined Statistical Area that includes the Lafayette metropolitan area (Benton, Carroll, and Tippecanoe counties) and the Frankfort micropolitan area (Clinton County), which had a combined population of 212,408 at the 2000 United States Census.

2010 census
As of the 2010 United States Census, there were 67,140 people, 28,545 households, and 15,863 families in the city. The racial makeup of the city was 74.2% White, 11.2% African American, 0.4% Native American, 1% Asian, 0.0% from other races, and 2.7% from two or more races. Hispanic or Latino of any race were 16.3% of the population.

There were 28,545 households, of which 29.4% had children under the age of 18 living with them, 36.7% were married couples living together, 13.7% had a female householder with no husband present, 5.2% had a male householder with no wife present, and 44.4% were non-families. 34.9% of all households were made up of individuals, and 9% had someone living alone who was 65 years of age or older. The average household size was 2.30 and the average family size was 3.00.

The median age in the city was 31.9 years. 23.8% of residents were under the age of 18; 12.9% were between the ages of 18 and 24; 29.9% were from 25 to 44; 22.2% were from 45 to 64, and 11.3% were 65 years of age or older. The gender makeup of the city was 48.7% male and 51.3% female.

2000 census

As of the 2000 United States Census, there were 56,397 people, 24,060 households, and 13,666 families in the city. The racial makeup of the city was 88.91% White; 3.22% African American; 0.37% Native American; 1.22% Asian; 0.04% Pacific Islander; 4.61% from other races, and 1.62% from two or more races. Hispanic or Latino of any race were 9.11% of the population.

There were 24,060 households, out of which 27.0% had children under the age of 18 living with them; 42.5% were married couples living together; 10.2% had a female householder with no husband present; and 43.2% were non-families. 33.2% of all households were made up of individuals, and 9.4% had someone living alone who was 65 years of age or older. The average household size was 2.31 individuals and the average family size was 2.98.

The city population contained 23.2% under the age of 18; 14.2% from 18 to 24; 31.3% from 25 to 44; 19.3% from 45 to 64; and 12.0% who were 65 years of age or older. The median age was 32 years. For every 100 females, there were 97.7 males. For every 100 females age 18 and over, there were 95.3 males.

The median income for a household in the city was $35,859, and the median income for a family was $45,480. Males had a median income of $32,892 versus $23,049 for females. The per capita income for the city was $19,217. About 8.0% of families and 12.1% of the population were below the poverty line, including 15.8% of those under age 18 and 4.6% of those age 65 or over.

Government
The government consists of a mayor – elected in a citywide vote – and a city council of nine members. Six are elected from individual districts; three are elected at-large.

Education

Colleges
 Ivy Tech Community College of Indiana
 Purdue University (in West Lafayette)
 A campus of the Purdue Polytechnic Institute

Public
K-12 public education in Lafayette is provided by the Lafayette School Corporation. The Tippecanoe School Corporation also administers county schools nearby. New Community School was a tuition-free elementary charter school (sponsored by Ball State University) located on the north side of Lafayette that permanently closed at the end of 2016. Beacon Academy was a charter school that was located in West Lafayette and closed in 2018.

Private

 Faith Christian School
 Lafayette Christian School
 Lafayette Central Catholic Jr/Sr High School
 Montessori School of Greater Lafayette
 St. Boniface Middle School
 St. Lawrence Catholic School
 St. Mary Cathedral Elementary School
 St. James Lutheran School

Public library
The Lafayette area has three branch locations of the Tippecanoe County Public Library:

 Downtown Library

 Wyandotte Branch

 West Lafayette Klondike Branch

News and media
Newspapers
 Journal & Courier. The newspaper, which serves the Greater Lafayette area, has its newsroom and offices located in downtown Lafayette. Journal & Courier also has its own printing services for itself and other papers in the region on the eastside of Lafayette.
 Purdue Exponent. Purdue University's independent student newspaper serves Purdue, West Lafayette, and Lafayette, and has its newsroom and offices located off campus on Northwestern Avenue in West Lafayette.
 The Lafayette Leader

Television

 WPBI-LD 16 (Fox; NBC on LD2; ABC on LD3)
 WLFI-TV 18 (CBS; CW on DT2; ION on DT3; GetTV on DT4)
 WPBY-LD 35 (ABC; MeTV/MyNetworkTV on LD2)
 

From 1953 until the 2016 launch of WPBI-LD, WLFI-TV had been the only "Big Three" (ABC, CBS and NBC—or, including Fox, "big four") commercial network television broadcaster in the Lafayette market. With the 2017 launch of WPBY-LD, local broadcasts of all "big four" networks became available.

WRTV, WTHR, WTTV, and WXIN, the respective ABC, NBC, CBS, and Fox affiliates in Indianapolis which had been carried by cable and satellite providers in the Lafayette market as "out-of-market" stations, remain viewable in the area via a large over-the-air antenna or, in some cases, via a subscription satellite or streaming service. Cable provider Comcast Xfinity discontinued its remaining carriage of Indianapolis-based "big four" stations on March 7, 2018, but resumed carriage of WTHR and WRTV two days later.

Commercial Radio Stations

 WASK
 WASK-FM
 WAZY-FM
 WKHY-FM
 WKOA-FM
 WLQQ
 WBPE
 WSHY-AM
 WXXB-FM
 WYCM

Non-commercial Radio Stations

 WBAA-AM/FM
 WHPL-FM
 WJEF-FM
 WQSG-FM
 WTGO-LP FM
 WWCC-LP FM

Transportation

Airports 
No airports are located within Lafayette city limits. The nearest general aviation airport is Purdue University Airport (LAF) in West Lafayette.

Highways

  Interstate 65 to Gary, Indiana (near Chicago) and Indianapolis
  US 52 to Joliet, Illinois (also near Chicago) and Indianapolis
  US 231 to Rensselaer, Indiana and Owensboro, Kentucky
  State Road 25
  State Road 26
  State Road 38

Railroads
Amtrak, the national passenger rail system, provides passenger rail service to Lafayette through the Cardinal to Chicago, Washington D.C., and New York City. Norfolk Southern; CSX; Kankakee, Beaverville and Southern Railroad; and Toledo, Peoria and Western Railway (RailAmerica) provide freight rail service. Many lines that originally passed through the downtown were redirected in the mid-1990s to a rail corridor near the Wabash River.

Bus service

 CityBus local bus service by the Greater Lafayette Public Transportation Corporation
 Greyhound intercity bus service
 Lafayette Limo shuttle service to the Indianapolis International Airport and O'Hare International Airport
 Reindeer Shuttle to the Indianapolis International Airport and O'Hare International Airport
 Express Air Coach shuttle service to the O'Hare International Airport

Economy
Much of the area's economy centers around the academic and industrial activities of Purdue University, although private industry and commerce independent of the university also exist in the community, with multiple large manufacturing operations in the city employing thousands of workers. Some examples:

 Arconic, a producer of aluminum extrusions and tubes
 Caterpillar Large Engine Division, producer of large diesel and natural gas engines
 Wabash National, world's largest manufacturer of semi-truck trailers
 Subaru of Indiana Automotive, the only non-Japanese producer of Subaru vehicles.
 Evonik (Tippecanoe Laboratories) pharmaceuticals/chemicals
 Tate & Lyle, manufacturer of Splenda(R) and other sweeteners; has two plants in Lafayette
 ZF Commercial Steering Systems
 Landis+Gyr, manufacturer of electric meters for global ANSI markets
 Cargill, soybean oil mill

Arts and culture

Arts organizations

 Haan Mansion Museum of Indiana Art
 Tippecanoe Arts Federation
 Art Museum of Greater Lafayette
 The Long Center for the Performing Arts
 Lafayette Symphony Orchestra
 Civic Theatre of Greater Lafayette

Fairs and festivals

 Feast of the Hunters' Moon
 Hands on Transportation
 Mini Maker Faire of Greater Lafayette
 Art in the Park
 OUTfest
 Mosey Down Main Street
 Beers Across the Wabash
 Round the Fountain Art Fair
 A Taste of Tippecanoe

Notable people from Lafayette
For notable residents associated with Purdue University, see List of Purdue University people.

Entertainment

 Karen Black – actress, attended Lafayette Jefferson High School 
 Jeremy Camp – Christian recording artist
 Eric Carlson - lead guitarist, songwriter, founding member of The Mentors
 Embeth Davidtz – film and television actress
 Louise Fazenda – film actor whose career spanned silent and talking movies
 Circuit Des Yeux - musician
 Charles Foley – co-inventor of the game Twister
 Mass Giorgini – musician and record producer
 Troy Hickman – writer best known for his comic book work (Common Grounds, Twilight Guardian, City of Heroes, Witchblade, Turok)
 Shannon Hoon – former lead vocalist of rock band Blind Melon
 John Korty – director, screenwriter, known for The Autobiography of Miss Jane Pittman and documentary Who Are the DeBolts? And Where Did They Get Nineteen Kids?
 Claudia Lee – television actress, Hart of Dixie
 Curt McDowell - director, writer, actor, artist
 Larry McNeely – musician, banjo player with Glen Campbell and for film soundtracks
 Tammy Lynn Michaels – television actor
 Ken Navarro – smooth jazz guitarist
 Chubby Parker – country music radio personality and recording artist
 Sydney Pollack – film actor, director, and producer
 Victor Potel – silent film actor
 Axl Rose – co-founder and lead vocalist of rock band Guns N' Roses
 Julia Scheeres – author, best known for ALA Alex Award-winning memoir Jesus Land
 Izzy Stradlin – songwriter, co-founder and former rhythm guitarist of rock band Guns N' Roses
 Henry Stram - actor

Sports

 William Fritz Afflis known professionally as "Dick the Bruiser" – professional football player and wrestler; graduated from Lafayette Jefferson HS
 Eric Bruntlett – professional baseball player
 Clem Crowe – professional football and basketball player
 Todd Dunwoody – professional baseball player
 Ray Ewry – 10-time Olympic champion in track and field
 Bernard "Bernie" Flowers – college and professional football player; born in Cleveland area, lived in Lafayette
 Bob Friend – professional baseball player
 Dustin Keller – professional football player; graduated from Lafayette Jefferson HS
 Pete Halsmer – professional race car driver
 Charles Kirkpatrick – professional race car driver
 Josh Lindblom – professional baseball player
 Chukie Nwokorie – professional football player; graduated from Lafayette Jefferson HS
 Clayton Richard – professional baseball player; graduated from McCutcheon HS
 Erik Sabel – professional baseball player
 Justin Smith – football player
 George Souders – professional race car driver (1927)

Business, law, politics

 Roger D. Branigin – Governor of Indiana 1965–1969
 John Burger – member of the Minnesota House of Representatives
 Steve Carter – Indiana Attorney General
 Henry Leavitt Ellsworth – first Commissioner of the United States Patent and Trademark Office; real estate developer
 Henry W. Ellsworth – son of Henry Leavitt Ellsworth, attorney, poet, author and Minister to Sweden
 David W. Evans – US Representative, 6th Congressional District Indiana 1975–1983
 Dan Flanagan – Justice of the Indiana Supreme Court
 Clara Shortridge Foltz (1849–1934) – first female lawyer on the West Coast
 Joseph García – Former Lt. Governor of Colorado
 Herman Joseph Justin – founded Justin Boot Company
 Brian Lamb – founder of C-SPAN
 Bill Long – state representative
 Frank Posegate – journalist, mayor of St. Joseph, Missouri
 John Purdue – Purdue Block, Tippecanoe County founder, founding benefactor of Purdue University
 Barbara Ringer – first female register of copyrights
 Alvah Curtis Roebuck – founded Sears, Roebuck and Company

Academic, science, technology

 Eric J. Barron – 14th President of Florida State University, 18th President of Penn State
 Herbert C. Brown – Nobel Prize laureate in chemistry
 Christopher L. Eisgruber – 20th President of Princeton University
 Daniel X. Freedman – pioneer in biological psychiatry, discovered link of hallucinogens to brain transmitters
 Andrew McCammon – physical and theoretical chemist
 Donald E. Williams – astronaut
 Ian Murdock – software engineer, created Debian

Other
 Emily Thornton Charles, poet, journalist
 Benjaman Kyle, known for identity loss due to dissociative amnesia
 Evaleen Stein (1863-1923), author, limner

Points of interest

 Purdue University, located in West Lafayette
 Jerry E. Clegg Botanic Garden;
 Horticulture Gardens at Purdue University

Prophet's Rock
10 minutes North of Lafayette lies Prophet Rock, where the Prophet Tenskwatawa, the half brother of Tecumseh, stood watch encouraging the local Shawnee Native Americans to fight against the encamped army forces of William Henry Harrison in the Battle Of Tippecanoe in 1811. Tenskwatawa was a spiritual leader, but not a military man. His brother was out of town as the U.S. Army forces marched North, with hopes to destroy Prophetstown. Tenskwatawa had sought to have a meeting with Harrison to discuss how to avoid going to war. In the evening before the war, he sought a spiritual vision that led him to believe that Harrison must be assassinated. Early in the morning of November 6, the warriors attacked Harrison's militia and war ensued. The warriors fell weak in supplies against the militia, and succumbed. Prophetstown was taken over where the militia stole supplies and burnt it down. The rock where Tenskwatawa stood still stands over the battlefield, though now covered with much taller trees. The rock can be accessed by scaling its front or by hiking the ridge that leads to the top.

Headstone of Martin P. Jenners
The Martin Jenners headstone is at the Spring Vale Cemetery in Lafayette. Jenners was a Civil War veteran who was known as the first white person born in Tippecanoe County and as an outspoken atheist. Originally located in Greenbush Cemetery, his headstone is unique because he had it placed in the cemetery fourteen years before his death, with this inscription: "My only objection to religion is that it is not true. No preaching, no praying, no psalm singing on this lot." Jenners' headstone cites two verses that contradict each other, hence making the Bible untrue: I Corinthians 15:52, which talks about believers being raised from the dead "in a twinkling of an eye", and Isaiah 26:14, which states "They are now dead, they live no more; their spirits do not rise." The headstone received national attention at the time, despite attempts to have it removed, and it continued to draw visitors from around the country. Jenners' headstone inscription has been cited by believers as an example of Bible writings being taken out of context.

Notable buildings

 Judge Cyrus Ball House, listed on the National Register of Historic Places
 James H. Ward House, listed on the National Register of Historic Places
 Temple Israel, 17 South 7th St. - one of the nation's oldest surviving synagogue buildings.
 Trinity United Methodist Church (Trinity Methodist Episcopal Church until 1969) – the first church congregation in the Lafayette area. Its current building was erected in 1869 by William Heath and has remained intact to this day.
 Tippecanoe Mall - the city's main shopping center.
Tippecanoe County Courthouse - built 1882-1884 at a cost of around $500,000 (double the original estimate).

Gallery

Sister cities
Lafayette has two sister cities as designated by Sister Cities International.

  Longkou, Shandong, China
  Ōta, Gunma, Japan (October 1993)

References

External links

 
 City of Lafayette, Indiana website
 Lafayette Online 

 
Cities in Indiana
Populated places established in 1825
Cities in Tippecanoe County, Indiana
County seats in Indiana
Lafayette metropolitan area, Indiana
1825 establishments in Indiana
Gilbert du Motier, Marquis de Lafayette